Colder Than Here is the debut play by the British playwright Laura Wade. It premiered in 2005 at the Soho Theatre directed by Abigail Morris. 
 
The comedy explores a woman dying of bone cancer and her family coming to terms with her impending death. 

Joint with Laura Wade's other play that also premiered that year concerning death Breathing Corpses it won the writer the Critics' Circle Theatre Award for Most Promising Playwright and an Olivier Award nomination for Outstanding Achievement in an Affiliate Theatre. 

The play has been subsequently produced off-Broadway by MCC Theater in New York, 2005, in Darmstadt in 2006  and Stockholm in 2006 and 2007, as well as in Mexico in 2017.

References

2005 plays
2000s debut plays
British plays